The 2012–13 Colorado Avalanche season was the 41st overall season for the franchise, 34th season in the National Hockey League (NHL), since June 22, 1979, and 18th season since the franchise relocated to Colorado to start the 1995–96 NHL season. The regular season was reduced from its usual 82 games to 48 due to the 2012–13 NHL lockout.

Off-season
On September 4, 2012, the Avalanche named Gabriel Landeskog as the fourth team captain in Avalanche history, after Milan Hejduk resigned from the role. Landeskog became the youngest captain in NHL history, being 11 days younger than Sidney Crosby was when Crosby was named captain of the Pittsburgh Penguins in 2007.

Regular season
The Avalanche finished the season with the worst record in the Western Conference and second-worst record in the league. As a result, head coach Joe Sacco was fired the day after Colorado's regular season ended. Former Avalanche goaltender Patrick Roy was hired as the new head coach on May 23, 2013.

Standings

Schedule and results

Regular season

|- align="center" bgcolor=#FFBBBB
| 1 || January 19 || Colorado Avalanche || 2–4 || Minnesota Wild || || Varlamov || 0–1–0 || 0 || Recap
|- align="center" bgcolor=#CCFFCC
| 2 || January 22 || Los Angeles Kings || 1–3 || Colorado Avalanche || || Varlamov || 1–1–0 || 2 || Recap
|- align="center" bgcolor=CCFFCC
| 3 || January 24 || Columbus Blue Jackets || 0–4 || Colorado Avalanche || || Varlamov || 2–1–0 || 4 || Recap
|- align="center" bgcolor=#FFBBBB
| 4 || January 26 || Colorado Avalanche || 0–4 || San Jose Sharks || || Varlamov || 2–2–0 || 4 || Recap
|- align="center" bgcolor=#FFBBBB
| 5 || January 28 || Colorado Avalanche || 1–4 || Edmonton Oilers || || Varlamov || 2–3–0 || 4 || Recap
|- align="center" bgcolor=#FFBBBB
| 6 || January 30 || Colorado Avalanche || 0–3 || Vancouver Canucks || || Varlamov || 2–4–0 || 4 || Recap
|- align="center" bgcolor=CCFFCC
| 7 || January 31 || Colorado Avalanche || 6–3 || Calgary Flames || || Giguere || 3–4–0 || 6 || Recap
|-

|- align="center" bgcolor="#cfc"
| 8 || February 2 || Edmonton Oilers || 1–3 || Colorado Avalanche || || Varlamov || 4–4–0 || 8 || Recap
|- align="center" bgcolor=FFBBBB
| 9 || February 4 || Dallas Stars || 3–2 || Colorado Avalanche || || Varlamov || 4–5–0 || 8 || Recap
|- align="center" bgcolor=FFBBBB
| 10 || February 6 || Anaheim Ducks || 3–0 || Colorado Avalanche || || Varlamov || 4–6–0 || 8 || Recap
|- align="center" bgcolor=white
| 11 || February 11 || Phoenix Coyotes || 3–2 || Colorado Avalanche || OT || Varlamov || 4–6–1 || 9 || Recap
|- align="center" bgcolor="#cfc"
| 12 || February 14 || Colorado Avalanche || 4–3 || Minnesota Wild || SO || Giguere || 5–6–1 || 11 || Recap
|- align="center" bgcolor=FFBBBB
| 13 || February 16 || Colorado Avalanche || 4–6 || Edmonton Oilers || || Varlamov || 5–7–1 || 11 || Recap
|- align="center" bgcolor="#cfc"
| 14 || February 18 || Nashville Predators || 5–6 || Colorado Avalanche || || Varlamov || 6–7–1 || 13 || Recap
|- align="center" bgcolor="#cfc"
| 15 || February 20 || St. Louis Blues || 0–1 || Colorado Avalanche || OT || Varlamov || 7–7–1 || 15 || Recap
|- align="center" bgcolor=FFBBBB
| 16 || February 23 || Colorado Avalanche || 1–4 || Los Angeles Kings || || Varlamov || 7–8–1 || 15 || Recap
|- align="center" bgcolor=white
| 17 || February 24 || Colorado Avalanche || 3–4 || Anaheim Ducks || OT || Giguere || 7–8–2 || 16 || Recap
|- align="center" bgcolor=white
| 18 || February 26 || Colorado Avalanche || 2–3 || San Jose Sharks || SO || Varlamov || 7–8–3 || 17 || Recap
|- align="center" bgcolor="#cfc"
| 19 || February 28 || Calgary Flames || 4–5 || Colorado Avalanche || || Varlamov || 8–8–3 || 19 || Recap
|-

|- align="center" bgcolor=white
| 20 || March 3 || Colorado Avalanche || 1–2 || Columbus Blue Jackets || OT || Varlamov || 8–8–4 || 20 || Recap
|- align="center" bgcolor=FFBBBB
| 21 || March 5 || Colorado Avalanche || 1–2 || Detroit Red Wings || || Giguere || 8–9–4 || 20 || Recap
|- align="center" bgcolor=FFBBBB
| 22 || March 6 || Colorado Avalanche || 2–3 || Chicago Blackhawks || || Varlamov || 8–10–4 || 20 || Recap
|- align="center" bgcolor="#cfc"
| 23 || March 8 || Chicago Blackhawks || 2–6 || Colorado Avalanche || || Varlamov || 9–10–4 || 22 || Recap
|- align="center" bgcolor="#cfc"
| 24 || March 10 || San Jose Sharks || 2–3 || Colorado Avalanche || OT || Varlamov || 10–10–4 || 24 || Recap
|- align="center" bgcolor=FFBBBB
| 25 || March 12 || Edmonton Oilers || 4–0 || Colorado Avalanche || || Varlamov || 10–11–4 || 24 || Recap
|- align="center" bgcolor=FFBBBB
| 26 || March 14 || Colorado Avalanche || 3–5 || Minnesota Wild || || Varlamov || 10–12–4 || 24 || Recap
|- align="center" bgcolor=FFBBBB
| 27 || March 16 || Minnesota Wild || 6–4 || Colorado Avalanche || || Varlamov || 10–13–4 || 24 || Recap
|- align="center" bgcolor=FFBBBB
| 28 || March 18 || Chicago Blackhawks || 5–2 || Colorado Avalanche || || Varlamov || 10–14–4 || 24 || Recap
|- align="center" bgcolor="#cfc"
| 29 || March 20 || Dallas Stars || 3–4 || Colorado Avalanche || || Varlamov || 11–14–4 || 26 || Recap
|- align="center" bgcolor=FFBBBB
| 30 || March 23 || Colorado Avalanche || 2–5 || Dallas Stars || || Varlamov || 11–15–4 || 26 || Recap
|- align="center" bgcolor=FFBBBB
| 31 || March 24 || Vancouver Canucks || 3–2 || Colorado Avalanche || || Giguere || 11–16–4 || 26 || Recap
|- align="center" bgcolor=FFBBBB
| 32 || March 27 || Colorado Avalanche || 3–4 || Calgary Flames || || Varlamov || 11–17–4 || 26 || Recap
|- align="center" bgcolor=FFBBBB
| 33 || March 28 || Colorado Avalanche || 1–4 || Vancouver Canucks || || Varlamov || 11–18–4 || 26 || Recap
|- align="center" bgcolor="#cfc"
| 34 || March 30 || Nashville Predators || 0–1 || Colorado Avalanche || OT || Varlamov || 12–18–4 || 28 || Recap
|-

|- align="center" bgcolor=FFBBBB
| 35 || April 1 || Colorado Avalanche || 2–3 || Detroit Red Wings || || Varlamov || 12–19–4 || 28 || Recap
|- align="center" bgcolor=FFBBBB
| 36 || April 2 || Colorado Avalanche || 1–3 || Nashville Predators || || Giguere || 12–20–4 || 28 || Recap
|- align="center" bgcolor=white
| 37 || April 5 || Detroit Red Wings || 3–2 || Colorado Avalanche || OT || Giguere || 12–20–5 || 29 || Recap
|- align="center" bgcolor=FFBBBB
| 38 || April 6 || Colorado Avalanche || 0–4 || Phoenix Coyotes || || Varlamov || 12–21–5 || 29 || Recap
|- align="center" bgcolor=FFBBBB
| 39 || April 8 || Calgary Flames || 3–1 || Colorado Avalanche || || Giguere || 12–22–5 || 29 || Recap
|- align="center" bgcolor="#cfc"
| 40 || April 10 || Colorado Avalanche || 4–1 || Anaheim Ducks || || Giguere || 13–22–5 || 31 || Recap
|- align="center" bgcolor=FFBBBB
| 41 || April 11 || Colorado Avalanche || 2–3 || Los Angeles Kings || SO || Giguere || 13–22–6 || 32 || Recap
|- align="center" bgcolor="#cfc"
| 42 || April 13 || Vancouver Canucks || 3–4 || Colorado Avalanche || || Giguere || 14–22–6 || 34 || Recap
|- align="center" bgcolor=white
| 43 || April 15 || Columbus Blue Jackets || 4–3 || Colorado Avalanche || OT || Giguere || 14–22–7 || 35 || Recap
|- align="center" bgcolor=FFBBBB
| 44 || April 19 || Edmonton Oilers || 4–1 || Colorado Avalanche || || Varlamov || 14–23–7 || 35 || Recap
|- align="center" bgcolor="#cfc"
| 45 || April 21 || St. Louis Blues || 3–5 || Colorado Avalanche || || Giguere || 15–23–7 || 37 || Recap
|- align="center" bgcolor=FFBBBB
| 46 || April 23 || Colorado Avalanche || 1–3 || St. Louis Blues || || Varlamov || 15–24–7 || 37 || Recap
|- align="center" bgcolor="#cfc"
| 47 || April 26 || Colorado Avalanche || 5–4 || Phoenix Coyotes || SO || Varlamov || 16–24–7 || 39 || Recap
|- align="center" bgcolor=FFBBBB
| 48 || April 27 || Minnesota Wild || 3–1 || Colorado Avalanche || || Varlamov || 16–25–7 || 39 || Recap
|-

Playoffs
The Colorado Avalanche failed to qualify for the 2013 Stanley Cup playoffs.

Player statistics
Final stats 
Skaters

Goaltenders

†Denotes player spent time with another team before joining the Avalanche. Stats reflect time with the Avalanche only.
‡Traded mid-season
Bold/italics denotes franchise record

Transactions 
The Avalanche have been involved in the following transactions during the 2012–13 season.

Trades 

|}

Free agents acquired

Free agents lost

Claimed via waivers

Lost via waivers

Lost via retirement

Player signings

Draft picks 
Colorado's picks at the 2012 NHL Entry Draft in Pittsburgh, Pennsylvania.

Draft notes
 The Avalanche's first-round pick (#11) and second-round pick (#54) went to the Washington Capitals as the result of a July 1, 2011, trade that sent the rights for Semyon Varlamov to the Avalanche in exchange for these picks.
 The Avalanche's fourth-round pick went to the Phoenix Coyotes as the result of a June 28, 2010, trade that sent Daniel Winnik to the Avalanche in exchange for this pick.

See also 
 2012–13 NHL season

References

Colorado Avalanche seasons
C
C
Colorado Avalanche
Colorado Avalanche